Reino Vihtori "Repe" Helismaa (12 July 1913, Helsinki – 21 January 1965) was a Finnish singer-songwriter, musician and scriptwriter, mainly known for his humorous, yet homely songs. One of his best-known interpreters was Tapio Rautavaara. He also scripted the comic strip Maan mies Marsissa, drawn by Ami Hauhio.

Works
Song lyrics: Helismaa wrote over five thousand song lyrics. Some of the most famous include:
 Balladi Villistä Lännestä (A ballad of the Wild West)
 Daiga-daiga-duu (Diga-diga-doo)
 Hiljainen kylätie (A quiet village street)
 Kaksi vanhaa tukkijätkää (Two old lumberjacks)
 Kulkuri ja joutsen (The tramp and the swan; translation of originally Swedish song Vagabonden och svanen by Lasse Dahlquist)
 Kulkurin iltatähti (The tramp's evening star)
 Lentävä kalakukko (The flying kalakukko)
 Meksikon pikajuna (The Mexico Express, original: Orient Express)
 Päivänsäde ja menninkäinen (The sunbeam and the goblin)
 Rakovalkealla (At the campfire)
 Reppu ja reissumies (The knapsack and the travelling man)
 Rovaniemen markkinoilla (At the Rovaniemi fair)
 Suutarin tyttären pihalla (At the shoemaker's daughter's yard)

Other works by Helismaa include 8 plays, 10 revues, 32 film manuscripts and 104 radio plays.
 Screenplays for several Pekka ja Pätkä -comedy films made in the 1950s.

References

External links

 Last.fm

1913 births
1965 deaths
Singers from Helsinki
People from Uusimaa Province (Grand Duchy of Finland)
Finnish male singer-songwriters
Finnish-language poets
20th-century Finnish male singers
20th-century Finnish male writers
Writers from Helsinki
Finnish lyricists
Finnish comics writers